Karel Bláha (born 1 June 1975) is a retired Czech athlete specialising in the 400 meter dash. His best individual outing was the seventh place at the 2002 European Championships. In addition, he represented his country at the 2001 World Championships where he narrowly missed the semifinals despite equaling his personal best in the heats.

He won the gold medal in 4 × 400 metres relay at the 2000 European Indoor Championships, setting the new national record.

Competition record

Personal bests
Outdoor
200 metres – 21.20 (+1.6 m/s) (Kladno 2006)
400 metres – 45.82 (Pilsen 2000)
800 metres – 1:49.38 (Turnov 2001)

Indoor
60 metres – 7.02 (Prague 2004)
200 metres – 22.07 (Prague 2004)
400 metres – 46.39 (Stuttgart 2000)

References

CAS profile

1975 births
Living people
Czech male sprinters